Tortyra ignita is a moth of the family Choreutidae. It is known from Cuba.

References

Tortyra
Endemic fauna of Cuba
Moths described in 1877